Srirangarajapuram is a mandal in Chittoor district of the Indian state of Andhra Pradesh. It is the mandal headquarters of Srirangarajapuram mandal.

Politics 

Assembly constituency

'Puttur' was an assembly constituency till 2008. After De-limitation, Puttur constituency was dissolved and  merged with Nagari, Andhra Pradesh. Srirangarajapuram mandal is separated and merged with Gangadhara nellore.
The current representative from 2013 election is - Narayana Swamy (YSR Congress Party) .

Lok Sabha constituency

'Tirupati' was  Lok Sabha constituency till 2008. After de-limitation, constituency was dissolved and Srirangarajapuram Mandal was merged with Chittoor (Lok Sabha constituency) current representative from 2009 election  is Naramalli Sivaprasad from Telugu Desam Party.

References 

Villages in Chittoor district
Mandal headquarters in Chittoor district